Vintage Reserve is a compilation album by the New Orleans, LA based band Galactic. It features tracks found on their three previous records, as well as two live, unreleased tracks.

Track listing
 "Welcome to New Orleans"  – 0:14
 "Something's Wrong With This Picture"  – 5:54
 "Doublewide"  – 4:52
 "Tighten Your Wig"  – 3:11
 "Century City"  – 4:54
 "Jeffe 2000"  – 0:58
 "Go Go"  – 3:02
 "Start from Scratch"  – 4:12
 "Bobski 2000"  – 1:41 	
 "Get a Head On"  – 5:36
 "Green Minute"  – 3:48
 "Metermaid"  – 1:37
 "Quiet Please"  – 10:54
 "Sew Sew Sew" (live)  – 7:51 featuring Big Chief Monk Boudreaux & the Golden Eagles Mardi Gras Indians, Triple Threat, and Lil Rascals Brass Band
 "Doo Rag" (live)  – 8:52 featuring Triple Threat

Personnel
Galactic:
 Theryl DeClouet - vocals
 Ben Ellman - harmonica, programming, saxophone
 Robert Mercurio - bass, vocals, photography
 Stanton Moore - drums, loops
 Richard Vogel - keyboards
 Jeff Raines - guitar
 Dan Prothero - producer
 Chaz Harper - remastering
 Dino Perrucci - photography

External links
 Official Galactic site

2003 compilation albums
Galactic albums
Volcano Entertainment compilation albums